Metrolínea is the mass transportation system that operates in Bucaramanga, in the department of Santander, Colombia. It operates green buses and is managed by Tisa, an enterprise that is managed by Dr. Carlos Arenas, a Bucaramangaian engineer. Metroline operates 50 buses, and goes through the most important places of Bucaramanga and Piedecuesta, a nearby town.   

Santander Department
Public transport in Colombia